The Haena Archeological Complex, on Kauai near Hanalei, Hawaii, is an archeological site complex that is listed on the U.S. National Register of Historic Places.

It includes several sites: (1) house of high chief Lohiau (lover of Hi'iaka); (2) Ke-ahu-a-Laka hālau hula platform; (3) Ka-ulu-a-paoa heiau platform
It dates from c.1600 and is listed on the National Register for its potential to yield information in the future.  The listed site includes  with 17 contributing sites and nine contributing structures.  It was listed on the National Register in 1984.

References 

Heiau
Archaeological sites in Hawaii
Ancient Hawaii
Protected areas established in 1984
Archaeological sites on the National Register of Historic Places in Hawaii
Historic districts on the National Register of Historic Places in Hawaii
National Register of Historic Places in Kauai County, Hawaii
Hawaii Register of Historic Places